Olha Saladuha (born 4 June 1983) is a Ukrainian former triple jumper. Since the 2019 Ukrainian parliamentary election she is a member of the Ukrainian parliament.

Biography
Saladuha took up athletics at the same club as Sergey Bubka, originally as a sprint hurdler before switching to triple jumping. In 1998 she set a European age-group record of 13.32 meters. Subsequently, she finished fifth at the 2002 World Junior Championships in Athletics. After struggling with injuries for the next two years and briefly retiring from the sport, she made steady progress, finishing fourth at the 2006 European Athletics Championships and winning the gold at the 2007 Summer Universiade with a personal best of 14.79 meters.

At the end of 2008 Saladuha took a year out of competition to start a family, giving birth to a daughter, Diana. She subsequently returned to competition in 2010, winning gold at the European Championships in Barcelona. The following year she set a new personal best at the Diamond League meeting in Eugene, Oregon, where she jumped 14.98 meters, and she then went on to take the gold medal at the 2011 World Championships in Athletics in Daegu.

She won the bronze medal at the 2012 Olympic Games in London, and was European champion in the women's triple jump in 2010, 2012 and 2014.

Saladukha's personal best jump is 14.99 meters, achieved on 29 June 2012 in Helsinki at the European Championships. She also has a personal best of 6.37 metres in the long jump.

She is married to racing cyclist Denys Kostyuk.

Saladukha took part in the July 2019 Ukrainian parliamentary election with the party Servant of the People. She was elected to parliament.

Achievements

Personal bests

All information taken from IAAF profile.

See also
Triple jump - Women's seasons best
List of members of the parliament of Ukraine, 2019–24

References

External links

 Verkhovna Rada (in Ukrainian)

1983 births
Living people
Ukrainian female triple jumpers
Olympic athletes of Ukraine
Athletes (track and field) at the 2008 Summer Olympics
Athletes (track and field) at the 2012 Summer Olympics
Athletes (track and field) at the 2016 Summer Olympics
Sportspeople from Donetsk
Olympic bronze medalists for Ukraine
World Athletics Championships medalists
European Athletics Championships medalists
Medalists at the 2012 Summer Olympics
World Athletics Championships athletes for Ukraine
Olympic bronze medalists in athletics (track and field)
Universiade medalists in athletics (track and field)
Universiade gold medalists for Ukraine
Universiade silver medalists for Ukraine
Recipients of the Order of Princess Olga, 1st class
Recipients of the Order of Princess Olga, 2nd class
Recipients of the Order of Princess Olga, 3rd class
Servant of the People (political party) politicians
Ukrainian sportsperson-politicians
Ninth convocation members of the Verkhovna Rada
21st-century Ukrainian women politicians
21st-century Ukrainian politicians
Diamond League winners
World Athletics Championships winners
Medalists at the 2005 Summer Universiade
Medalists at the 2007 Summer Universiade
Athletes (track and field) at the 2020 Summer Olympics
Laureates of the Prize of the Cabinet of Ministers of Ukraine for special achievements of youth in the development of Ukraine
Politicians from Donetsk
Women members of the Verkhovna Rada